Largina was a fort in the Roman province of Dacia.

See also
List of castra

External links
Roman castra from Romania - Google Maps / Earth

Notes

Roman legionary fortresses in Dacia
Roman legionary fortresses in Romania
History of Crișana
Historic monuments in Sălaj County